Pholas campechiensis is a species of bivalve belonging to the family Pholadidae.

The species is found in the Americas and West Africa.

References

Pholadidae
Bivalves described in 1791